The Bulgaria men's national volleyball team is controlled by the Bulgarian Volleyball Federation, which represents the country in international competitions and friendly matches.

History
The team's achievements include winning the Balkan Championships in 1980, Runners-Up (1970) and Third Place (1949, 1952, 1986, 2006) at the World Championship. At the European Championships Bulgaria has one Runners-Up (1951) and four Third Place (1955, 1981, 1983, 2009) finishes. Bulgaria has also achieved Runners-Up at the 1980 Summer Olympic Games in Moscow. The team has one third place at the World Cup (2007) and five Semi-Final appearances in the World League (1994, 2004, 2006, 2012, 2013). The team's most significant recent results include earning Third Place at the 2006 World Championship, the 2007 World Cup and 2009 European Championship as well as achieving Runners-Up at the first European Games in 2015.

Bulgaria first took part in the World League in 1994. During the debut season in the tournament, the team went all the way to the Semi-Finals; led by players like Lubo Ganev, Dimo Tonev, Martin Stoev, etc. In the next four editions, Bulgaria took part but did not manage to surpass its prior performance by reaching fifth in 1995, eight in 1996, sixth in 1997, and seventh in 1998. Under the guidance of Milorad Kijac, the new wave of players including Teodor Salparov, Danial Mihaylov, etc. mixed well with the more experienced Evgeni Ivanov, Plamen Konstantinov, Nikolay Ivanov, Vladimir Nikolov, Hristo Tsvetanov to result in the fifth-place rank in 2003. The next year, once again under Kijac, the team played some impressive games and succeeded to tie its best performance of reaching the Semi-Finals. The team included more players from the Under-21 team that the previous year won a medal at the World Championships, such as Matey Kaziyski and Milushev. In 2005 with a new coach, Martin Stoev, the team finished as the fifth rank, followed by another tied best-ever performance of reaching the Semi-Finals in 2006, and another fifth rank in 2007. In 2011 Bulgaria qualified for first time in the Final Round after four years, they finished as the fifth rank. The 2012 Final Round was held in the newly opened Armeets Arena in Sofia, and the host reached the Semi-Finals once again.

Statistics

Olympic Games
  1972 Munich — 4th place
  1980 Moscow —  Silver medal
 Gunchev, Stoyanov, Zlatanov, Dimitrov, Tsanov, Dimitrov, Petkov, Todorov, Simeonov, Valtchev, Iliev, Angelov.
  2012 London — 4th place
 G. Bratoev, Skrimov, Dimitrov, V. Bratoev, V. Nikolov, Yosifov, Salparov, Todorov, Aleksiev, Penchev, N. Nikolov, Sokolov. Head coach: Naydenov

World Championship
  1949 Czechoslovakia —  Bronze medal
  1952 Soviet Union —  Bronze medal
  1962 Soviet Union — 4th place
  1970 Bulgaria —  Silver medal
  1986 France —  Bronze medal
  2006 Japan —  Bronze medal
  2010 Italy — 7th place
  2014 Poland — 13th place
   2018 Italy/Bulgaria — 11th place
   2022 Poland/Slovenia — 20th place

World Cup
  1969 East Germany — 4th place
  2007 Japan —  Bronze medal

European Championship
  1950 Bulgaria — 4th place
  1951 France —  Silver medal
  1955 Romania —  Bronze medal
  1958 Czechoslovakia — 4th place
  1963 Romania — 4th place
  1981 Bulgaria —  Bronze medal
  1983 East Germany —  Bronze medal
  1995 Greece — 4th place
  2009 Turkey —  Bronze medal
   2011 Austria/Czech Republic — 6th place
   2013 Denmark/Poland — 4th place
   2015 Bulgaria/Italy — 4th place
  2017 Poland — 6th place
     2019 France/Slovenia/Belgium/Netherlands — 11th place
     2021 Poland/Czech Republic/Estonia/Finland — 11th place

World League
  1994 — 4th place
  1995 — 5th place
  1996 — 8th place
  1997 — 6th place
  1998 Milan — 7th place
  2003 Madrid — 5th place
  2004 Rome — 4th place
  2005 Belgrade — 5th place
  2006 Moscow — 4th place
  2007 Katowice — 5th place
  2008 Rio de Janeiro — 7th place
  2009 Belgrade — 10th place
  2010 Córdoba — 7th place
  2011 Gdańsk — 5th place
  2012 Sofia — 4th place
  2013 Mar del Plata — 4th place
  2014 Florence — 8th place
  2015 Rio de Janeiro — 10th place
  2016 Kraków — 11th place
  2017 Curitiba — 9th place

Nations League
  2018 Lille — 11th place
  2019 Chicago — 12th place
  2021 Rimini — 15th place
  2022 Bologna — 14th place

European Games
  2015 Baku —  Silver medal

Universiade
  1961 Sofia —  Silver medal
  1977 Sofia —  Gold medal

Team

Current squad
The following is the Bulgaria roster in the 2022 FIVB Volleyball Men's World Championship.

Head coach:  Nikolay Jeliazkov

Tsvetan Sokolov missed out on the first 2018 FIVB Volleyball Men's Nations League and the 2018 FIVB Volleyball Men's World Championship as he went on a knee surgery. However, he had recovered and participated in his club tournaments.

Head coaches

Kit providers
The table below shows the history of kit providers for the Bulgaria national volleyball team.

Sponsorship
The main sponsor of the national team is the Bulgarian betting company efbet, while Asics, Mikasa and Lidl are secondary sponsors.

See also
Bulgaria men's team
Bulgaria men's U19 team
Bulgaria men's U21 team
Bulgaria men's U23 team
Bulgaria women's team

References

External links
Official website
FIVB profile

National men's volleyball teams
Volleyball
Volleyball in Bulgaria
Men's sport in Bulgaria